Walter Edward Tinsley (10 August 1891 – 7 March 1966) was an English professional footballer who played as an inside forward for Sunderland.

References

1891 births
1966 deaths
People from Ironville
Footballers from Derbyshire
English footballers
Association football inside forwards
Alfreton Town F.C. players
Ashfield United F.C. players
Sunderland A.F.C. players
Middlesbrough F.C. players
Nottingham Forest F.C. players
Reading F.C. players
English Football League players